Hithudu is a 2015 Telugu-language philosophy film, produced by KSV on KSV Films banner and directed by Viplove. The film stars Jagapati Babu, Meera Nandan  and music composed by Koti.

The film won Nandi Award for Third Best Feature Film for the year 2014.

Plot
The film begins with a slumdog Nagaraju brought up by an association Seetaram Foundation established by Dr. Abhilasha. Nagaraju is top in EAMCET when various institutes attempt to bribe him to counterfeit the credit. Due to his financial status, Nagaraju accoutres the proposal. On the topic, Abhilasha regrets assisting Nagaraju, rebukes him, and divulges about the eminence of education. 15 years ago, she was a native tribe Abbulu of a remote village of Paderu near Visakhapatnam. Across the region, the races are subjugated and racially intolerances by a monster landlord Shavukar Mutyala Rao who compels them to be illiterates. Abbulu is familiar with Post Master Subbramanyam's family who has contacts with Maoists.

Once, at a meeting, a pragmatic Seetaram belongs to Lakshmanna Dalam acquainted with Abbulu. He reads their forlorn lives and realizes the concrete way out to abolish slavery is enlightenment. Hence, Seetaram opens the door for civilization by withdrawing his armament and constructing a school therein. After crossing many hurdles, Seetaram triumphs in getting all and sundry on the right path. Presently, Abbulu develops an intimate bond with him who titles her Abhilasha and is impressed with her intelligence. Like this, Lakshmana enforces Seetaram to educate Marxism which he denies. So, they vigorously haul him and it perturbs Abbulu. Nevertheless, he backs and boots his aim. Meanwhile, Shavukar conspires to hardly fuse with Abbulu when she reports it to Seetaram. But the villagers misconstrue their relationship and aggressively knits Abbulu with Shavukar by battering Seetaram.

Soon after the wedding, Abbulu absconds when Shavukar hunts her. However, Seetaram safeguards her and smashes the evils with his soldiery. Now, Seetaram boosts Abhilasha's courage and affixes her to a welfare organization for higher studies. Next, he sets back his men. Time passes, and Abhilasha turns into a meritorious medico and begins to disregard discipline. Plus, her colleague Sandeep loves her of which she is unbeknownst. One time, Seetaram visits to view her when she is overwhelmed with joy and the two spend a wonderful time. Abhilasha puts a wrong interpretation of his solicitous care and proposes to him. Herein, Seetaram scolds and quits. Then, Abhilisha lands at their village with Sandeep where the Post Master shows a resent. Moreover, he imparts Seetaram's fair mind, dreams & objectives are the impacts of pedagogy for societal welfare. The words soul-searches Abhilasha who is moving in Seetaram's footsteps espousing Sandeep. Being cognizant of it, Nagaraju also determines to proceed with her goals further. As of today, Abhilasha spots Seetaram alone excavating a hill to comfort the locals though everyone heckles him. At last, Abhilasha apologizes and pleads for him to accompany the rest of his life which he accepts. The movie ends on a happy note with Seetaram associating with Abhilasha's family.

Cast 
Jagapati Babu as Sita Ram
Meera Nandan as Abhilasha
Banerjee
Anoojram
C. V. L. Narasimha Rao
Laxman Meesala

Soundtrack 

Music was composed by Koti and released by ADITYA Music Company. Lyrics were written by Ananta Sriram.

References

External links

2010s Telugu-language films
Films scored by Koti